Braggadocio is an unincorporated community in Pemiscot County, Missouri, United States.

History
Braggadocio was founded circa 1847. A post office called Braggadocio has been in operation since 1881. Possibly the community was named because a large share of the early settlers were braggarts, or after the knight and horse thief Sir Braggadoccio, in Edmund Spenser's The Faerie Queene. Braggadocio has been noted for its unusual place name.

In 1927, an African-American man named Will Sherod was lynched in Braggadocio.

On April 2,2006, a F3 tornado hit the town, which caused 2 deaths.

On December 10, 2021, a EF-4 tornado also hit the town, causing a death.

References

Unincorporated communities in Pemiscot County, Missouri
Populated places established in 1847
Unincorporated communities in Missouri
1847 establishments in Missouri